"Complete Mess" is a song by Australian pop rock band 5 Seconds of Summer. It was released on 2 March 2022 independently in partnership with BMG, as the lead single from their fifth studio album 5SOS5. The song was written by the band and produced by guitarist Michael Clifford.

At the APRA Music Awards of 2023, the song was shortlisted for Song of the Year.

Background
The band teased "Complete Mess" in February 2022 sharing snippets of the song on TikTok and Twitter. Upon the release of "Complete Mess", the group also released a statement about the song:

The song was recorded at Rancho V in Joshua Tree, Clifford's own home studio and Dragonfly Creek in Malibu. The title of the song refers to a fan-favorite t-shirt that lead singer Luke Hemmings used to wear.

MTV describes the song as a "2000s alt-rock with a more mature but quite nostalgic sound," while Rolling Stone calls the song, "an expansive vibe with contemporary pop sensibilities."

Reception
"Complete Mess" was received with positive reviews, most praising the band for their growth and maturity of their sound. Soundigest.com calls it, "a song that's sheer emotional power sends chills down your body." Musictalkers.com praises the instrumental work of the song stating, "the utilization of authentic instruments layered with electronic, booming pop sounds is the contrast that perfectly mirrors 5 Seconds of Summer’s original vision when they first entered the music scene."

Music video
The music video for "Complete Mess" was released on 2 March 2022 and was directed by Lauren Dunn. The video is set in a desert and the quartet can be seen lying on their backs on the sand and walking in separate ways throughout the video. Towards the end, they join together and walk towards a blue orb of light, which represents "the place where all the songs, all the love, and everything comes from in this life," according to drummer Ashton Irwin. He also adds, "I guess the metaphorical sense is that the four of us are in this infinite place of creation, and the dessert represents that."

Personnel
Credits for "Complete Mess" adapted from AllMusic.

Musicians
Luke Hemmings – composer, guitar, keyboards, vocals
Michael Clifford – composer, guitar, producer, vocals
Calum Hood – bass, composer, keyboards, vocals
Ashton Irwin – backing vocals, composer, drums, keyboards

Production
Neal Avron – engineering
Chris Gehringer – engineering
Jacob Munk – engineering
Tim Nelson – producer
Scott Skrzynski – mixing assistant

Charts

Weekly charts

Year-end charts

Release history

References

2022 singles
2022 songs
5 Seconds of Summer songs